Niagara Cave is a limestone cave located in Harmony, Minnesota.  The cave is approximately 200 feet (61 m) deep; features include an underground stream, 60-foot waterfall, fossils, stalactites and stalagmites.  The cave is privately owned, with tours available seasonally.

The cave was first discovered in 1924, and in 1932, three spelunkers Al Cremer, Leo Tekippe, and Joe Flynn explored the cave and named the site Niagara Cave. Niagara Cave opened as a show cave in June 1934, and was described by geologist J Harlen Bretz in 1938.

The Minnesota Geological Survey noted in their 1995 survey, "Niagara Cave contains an excellent example of an underground river, complete with waterfall."

References

Limestone caves
Tourist attractions in Minnesota
Caves of Minnesota
Show caves in the United States